Jabal al-Akrad ( Jabal al-Akrād,  Mountain of the Kurds) is a rural mountainous region with an elevation that ranges from 400 to 1,000 meters above sea level, in northwestern Syria along the Coastal Mountain Range. It is located in the northeastern Latakia Governorate, near the borders with Idlib Governorate and Turkey. Jabal al-Akrad should not be confused with the neighboring Kurd Mountain, which is located further northeast.

Jabal al-Akrad is rich in forests and natural resources. As a result of the Syrian civil war the region has seen numerous military clashes between the armed opposition groups and the Syrian army. The Syrian Army recaptured the mountainous region in February 2016 in the 2015–2016 Latakia offensive.

Demographics
19th-century German traveler Martin Hartmann noted that some Sunni Muslims in the Ottoman nahiyah of Jabal al-Akrad claimed descent from Kurds who were forced to settle in the region 300 years ago but no longer spoke Kurdish.

References

Mountains of Syria
Latakia Governorate
Idlib Governorate